Rewa – Anand Vihar Terminal SF Express is a daily Superfast Express train of the Indian Railways, running between Rewa, a city of Madhya Pradesh and Anand Vihar Terminal of Delhi with LHB coaches which are more safe than normal ICF coaches. The train originally used to run from New Delhi Railway Station before being shifted to Anand Vihar station on 2 September 2012. The train is operated by the Northern Railway zone of Indian Railways on the section which is part of the busy Howrah–Delhi main line (Grand Trunk section). It is, along with the prestigious Shaan - E - Bhopal Express, one of the "first" ISO 9002 certified trains of India because of its security features and high priority on the Indian Railways. But it takes two hours more than Rajdhani Express to cover the same distance. It is also slower than some other Superfast trains in this section, but has one of highest commercial speeds among Non-Rajdhani trains.

The normal locomotive of Rewa Superfast Express is a TKD/GZB HoG WAP-7 locomotive from Tughlakabad/Ghaziabad shed. The train reverses from Satna Jn. and a WAP-7/WAP-4 locomotive from Itarsi (ET) shed hauls it up to Rewa terminal.

Schedule
The train numbers of this train are:-

12427 UP: Starts daily form Rewa at 16:40 HRS IST and reach Anand Vihar Terminal (Delhi) next Day morning at 6:35 Hrs.

12428 DN: Starts daily at 22:05 Hrs from Anand Vihar Terminal (Delhi) and reach Rewa next day morning at 11:10 Hrs.

Coach composition

 1 AC I Tier + II Tier (Hybrid)
 2 AC II Tier
 6 AC III Tier
 7 Sleeper Coaches
 4 General
 1 LSLRD (LHB Second Luggage, Guard & Divyaang Compartment)
 1 EOG Luggage/parcel van

Stoppage

 Rewa
 Satna
 Manikpur
 Dabhaura
 Shankargarh
 Allahabad
 Sirathu
 Fatehpur
 Kanpur Central
 Aligarh
 Ghaziabad
 Anand Vihar Terminal

Locomotive

Since the route is fully electrified a Ghaziabad(GZB) HOG WAP 7 locomotive hauls the train from Anand Vihar Terminal to Satna junction where a WAP-4 electric locomotive reverses and hauls the train for the entire journey to Rewa Terminal and vice versa.

Loco change: Satna Junction

See also

 Rewanchal Express

References

External links
Rewa - Delhi Anand Vihar ( T ) Express/12427 at India Rail Info
Delhi Anand Vihar ( T ) - Rewa Express/12428 at India Rail Info

Transport in Rewa, Madhya Pradesh
Transport in Delhi
Rail transport in Madhya Pradesh
Express trains in India
Rail transport in Delhi
Rail transport in Uttar Pradesh
Railway services introduced in 2003